is an Ōbaku Zen temple in Kokurakita-ku, Kitakyūshū, Fukuoka, Japan. Fukuju-ji is one of two bodaiji (菩提寺), or funeral temples, dedicated to Ogasawara Tadazane, the first daimyō of Kokura Domain. (The other is Toyokawa's Rinzai-ji.)

History
The temple was founded in 1665 by Ogasawara Tadazane with support from Sokuhi Nyoitsu, a Chinese monk. In 1669, Ogasawara Tadataka (小笠原忠雄), the second daimyō of Kokura, began planning the construction of the temple such as Kaisandō hall, the main hall, a bell tower and so on. 

Many temple structures were destroyed by fire in the Summer War of 1866. However, much of the temple and its numerous annexes, include the Buddha-Hall (仏殿 butsuden), the Chinese style architecture rebuilt in 1802, was survived after the war.

Gallery

References

External links
Fukuju-ji - Kitakyushu City 

 

Buddhist temples in Fukuoka Prefecture
Buildings and structures in Kitakyushu
Tourist attractions in Kitakyushu
Religious buildings and structures completed in 1665
1660s establishments in Japan
1665 establishments in Asia
Obaku temples